Shayna Rebecca Levy (born 6 April 1997) is an American-born Israeli footballer who plays as a defender and has appeared for the Israel women's national team.

Career
Levy played for the North Salem Tigers in high school. In college, she played for the Rochester Yellowjackets from 2015 to 2018, scoring 2 goals and recording 1 assist in 67 appearances for the Yellowjackets.

Levy has been capped for the Israel national team, appearing for the team during the 2019 FIFA Women's World Cup qualifying cycle.

Personal life
Levy is a native of Brewster, New York, though she was able to represent Israel through her maternal grandparents.

References

External links
 
 
 Profile from Israel Football Association

1997 births
Living people
People from Brewster, New York
Soccer players from New York (state)
Israeli women's footballers
Israel women's international footballers
Women's association football defenders
American women's soccer players
American people of Israeli descent
University of Rochester alumni
College women's soccer players in the United States